In enzymology, a CDP-acylglycerol O-arachidonoyltransferase is an enzyme that catalyzes the chemical reaction

arachidonoyl-CoA + CDP-acylglycerol  CoA + CDP-diacylglycerol

Thus, the two substrates of this enzyme are arachidonoyl-CoA and CDP-acylglycerol, whereas its two products are CoA and CDP-diacylglycerol.

This enzyme belongs to the family of transferases, specifically those acyltransferases transferring groups other than aminoacyl groups.  The systematic name of this enzyme class is arachidonoyl-CoA:CDP-acylglycerol O-arachidonoyltransferase. Other names in common use include CDP-acylglycerol O-arachidonyltransferase, and arachidonyl-CoA:CDP-acylglycerol O-arachidonyltransferase.  This enzyme participates in glycerophospholipid metabolism.

References

 

EC 2.3.1
Enzymes of unknown structure